The Office of the Commissioner of Insurance of Wisconsin is an independent agency of the Wisconsin state government responsible for supervising and regulating the insurance industry in Wisconsin.  The office licenses insurers operating in the state, examines their financial and business practices, investigates consumer complaints, ensures compliance with state laws and regulations, and provides information on the insurance industry to the public.

The Office is headquartered in the State Education Building, or GEF-3, in downtown Madison, Wisconsin.

History
The insurance business was first authorized and regulated in Wisconsin in 1870 (1870 Wisc. Act 56).  The original law vested insurance regulation as a power of the Secretary of State of Wisconsin.  These powers were transferred to a separate commissioner of insurance by an act of the Wisconsin Legislature in 1878 (1878 Wisc. Act 214).  The office was initially designed as a gubernatorial appointee, and the first insurance commissioner, Philip L. Spooner, Jr., was appointed by Governor William E. Smith.  In 1881, however, a new act of the Legislature (1881 Wisc. Act 300) converted the appointed office into a state-wide elected office.  This continued until 1911, when the office was converted back into a gubernatorial appointee.

Organization
The senior leadership of the Office consists of the Commissioner and Deputy Commissioner, along with the administrators and directors of the internal divisions of the Office.

 Commissioner: Nathan Ho​udek
 Deputy Commissioner: Rachel Cissne Carabell
 Administrator of Financial Regulation: Amy Malm
 Administrator of Market Regulation & Enforcement: Rebecca Rebholz
 Director of Operational Management: Jesse Patchak
 Director of Public Affairs: Sarah Sm​​​​ith
 Director of the Office of Administrative Services: Kristina​​​ Thole
 Chief Legal Counsel: Richard Wicka

Subordinate boards
Separate from the ordinary organizational structure of the Office, there are a number of commissions and boards created by acts of the Wisconsin Legislature to oversee, advise, or administer certain funds. 
 Board of Directors of the Insurance Security Fund
 Board of Governors of the Injured Patients and Families Compensation Fund / Wisconsin Health Care Liability Insurance Plan
 Injured Patients and Families Compensation Fund Peer Review Council

Commissioners

References

External links
 Wisconsin Office of the Commissioner of Insurance

Insurance Commissioner
Government agencies established in 1878
1878 establishments in Wisconsin